Otachyrium is a genus of South American plants in the grass family.

 Species
 Otachyrium aquaticum Send. & Soderstr. - Bahia, Minas Gerais
 Otachyrium boliviense Renvoize - Bolivia
 Otachyrium grandiflorum Send. & Soderstr. - Venezuela (Amazonas), Brazil (Goiás, Amazonas, D.F., Roraima)
 Otachyrium inaequale Pilg. - Guyana, Suriname, French Guiana, Venezuela, Brazil 
 Otachyrium piligerum Send. & Soderstr. - Goiás
 Otachyrium pterigodium (Trin.) Pilg. - Minas Gerais, Amazonas, D.F.
 Otachyrium seminudum Send. & Soderstr. - Goiás, Mato Grosso, D.F.
 Otachyrium versicolor (Döll) Henrard - Guyana, Suriname, French Guiana, Venezuela, Brazil, Colombia, Bolivia, Paraguay, Argentina (Corrientes, Misiones)

References

Panicoideae
Grasses of South America
Grasses of Brazil
Poaceae genera
Taxa named by Christian Gottfried Daniel Nees von Esenbeck